Wolfgang Hohensee (born January 3, 1927, in Berlin) is a German composer.

Life 
Thereafter he began studying musicology with Walther Vetter, Ernst Hermann Meyer and Hans-Heinz Dräger in Berlin and with Thrasybulos Georgiades in Heidelberg. From 1949 to 1951 he attended the master classes in composition of Hanns Eisler and Leo Spies at the Academy of Arts in Berlin. After working briefly for a radio station, he worked as a conductor, choral conductor and musical dramaturg from 1951 to 1957, inter alia at the German National Theatre (Weimar). Starting in 1955 he taught at the Academy of Music "Hanns Eisler", from 1962 as a docent for texture and since 1969 as a professor for composition. He received the Art Prize of the German Democratic Republic (1962 and 1970) as well as the Art Prize of the Free German Trade Union Federation (1970).

References

External links
 Saxbook: Wolfgang Hohensee
 

German composers
Recipients of the Patriotic Order of Merit in bronze
Academic staff of the Hochschule für Musik Hanns Eisler Berlin
Living people
1927 births
Musicians from Berlin